Parotis chlorochroalis is a moth in the family Crambidae. It was described by George Hampson in 1912. It is found in Cameroon, the Democratic Republic of the Congo (Katanga, South Kivu, Equateur) and Nigeria.

References

Moths described in 1912
Spilomelinae